The Skyliners are an American doo-wop group from Pittsburgh. The original lineup was: Jimmy Beaumont (lead), Janet Vogel (soprano), Wally Lester (tenor), Jackie Taylor (bass voice, guitarist), Joe Verscharen (baritone). The Skyliners were best known for their 1959 hit, "Since I Don't Have You".

History
The Skyliners also hit the top 40 with "This I Swear" and "Pennies from Heaven". Other classics include "It Happened Today" (1959), "Close Your Eyes" (1961), and "Comes Love" (1962). The original group dissolved in 1963, but re-united eleven years later (without Jackie Taylor), for what would become their last charted record, "Where Have They Gone?"

In 1965, Jimmy Beaumont recorded two notable singles for the Bang label: the first record, "Tell Me"/"I Feel Like I'm Falling in Love", had medium-tempo soul-styled tracks. 

For his second Bang 45, "I Never Loved Her Anyway"/"You Got Too Much Going for You", Beaumont transformed into an impressive soul singer, sounding nothing like his previous, more pop-styled efforts. It led some to question in later years, if it actually was his singing. These two tracks are now considered Northern Soul collectibles. The single was also issued on UK London HLZ 10059 in 1966.

Jackie Taylor was drafted into the U.S. Army about 1965. In 1975 Wally Lester and Joe Versharen left the group; they were replaced by new members, Jimmie Ross and Bob Sholes.

In 1978, the Detroit based record producer Don Davis — who produced Marilyn McCoo and Billy Davis Jr., Johnny Taylor, the Dramatics, and the Dells — picked up one of his favorite groups (the Skyliners) to record in his United Sound Studios. They recorded the group's "comeback" album for the RCA subsidiary, Tortoise International Records. The songs "Oh, How Happy" and "The Love Bug" were included, as was a hefty re-make of Dan Schafer's original RCA Victor single, "A Day Without You, Dear".

Janet Vogel committed suicide in 1980; Cathy Cooper joined the group as a replacement. She and Ross left two years later to form a duo; they were replaced by Rick Morris and Donna Groom.

Morris retired in 1993. Beaumont invited David Proch to join the group and he accepted. Also performing with the group at this time was Tom Sholes, brother of Bob Sholes. The two were local to the group; they attended St George High School in the Allentown neighborhood of Pittsburgh. The group became Beaumont, Groom, Proch, and Nick Pociask.

David Proch (at age 44) the third person to sing tenor for the Skyliners, died on October 19, 1998, in a car accident. His car collided with a truck hauling asphalt on U.S. Route 30 near Ligonier, Pennsylvania. Proch's place was taken by Dick Muse, a former member of the Laurels. Rick Morris replaced Muse in 2011. Frank Czuri replaced Morris in 2013. In January 2019 Jim Gregorakis replaced Nick Pociask. Eric Bruce replaced Frank Czuri in September 2019.

Their longtime manager and producer Joe Rock, who also co-wrote "Since I Don't Have You", died on April 4, 2000, at age 63, after complications from quadruple bypass heart surgery.

Four of the original members have died:
Janet Vogel (born June 10, 1942 in Pittsburgh) committed suicide on February 21, 1980, aged 37
Joe Verscharen (born August 30, 1940 in Pittsburgh) died of cancer on November 2, 2007, aged 67
Wally Lester (born Walter Paul Lester, Jr. on October 5, 1941 in Pittsburgh) died of pancreatic cancer in Southport, North Carolina on April 21, 2015, aged 73
Jimmy Beaumont (born James Beaumont on October 21, 1940 in Pittsburgh) died in McKeesport, Pennsylvania on October 7, 2017, aged 76.

Until his death, Jimmy Beaumont performed with the Skyliners in their current line-up of Nick Pociask, Frank Czuri, John Sarkis, and Donna Groom (whose husband, Mark Groom, has been the group's drummer/conductor for more than 25 years).

Discography

Albums
The Skyliners— Calico CLP-3000 (Mono only) (1959)
Since I Don't Have You — Original Sound OSR-LPM 5010 (Mono)/OSR-LPS-8873 (Stereo) (1963)
Once Upon a Time — Kama Sutra KSBS-2026 (1971)
The Skyliners — Tortoise International BXL1-2749 (1978)

Singles

Jimmy Beaumont solo singles
"The End of a Story" / "Baion Rhythms"—Colpix 607–1961
"Ev'rybody's Cryin'" (Billboard #100) / "Camera"—May 112–1961
"I Shoulda Listened to Mama" / "Juarez"—May 115–1962
"I'm Gonna Try My Wings" / "Never Say Goodbye"—May 120–1962
"Give Her My Best" / "I'll Always Be in Love with You"—May 136–1963
"There's No Other Love" / "Please Send Me Someone to Love"—Gallant 3007–1964
"Love Is a Dangerous Game" / "Just A Little Closer"—Gallant 3012–1964
"I Feel Like I'm Falling in Love" (Billboard #123) / "Tell Me"—Bang 510–1965
"You Got Too Much Going for You" / "I Never Loved Her Anyway"—Bang 525–1966

Janet Vogel solo single as Janet Deane
"Another Night Alone" / "I'm Glad I Waited"—Gateway 719–1963

Awards and recognition
The Skyliners were inducted into The Vocal Group Hall of Fame in 2002.

On August 11, 2019, a section of road in McKeesport PA's Renziehausen Park, Tulip Drive, was renamed Jimmy Beaumont Blvd. With Beaumont's family present, the dedication ceremony took place at the park's Lions Bandshell and was followed by a concert with the current Skyliners.

References

Bibliography
Joel Whitburn, The Billboard Book of Top 40 Hits. 7th edn, 2000,

External links
 Official Website
 Current Booking Website
 "The Skyliners" Vocal Group Hall of Fame Page
 Interview with Nick Pociask of the Skyliners
 Pittsburgh Music History Skyliners Profile
 Pittsburgh Music History Janet Vogel Profile
 Tortoise International Records

Doo-wop groups
Musical groups from Pittsburgh
Colpix Records artists
Jubilee Records artists
Kama Sutra Records artists
Original Sound artists